Júlio César Campozano and Emilio Gómez were the defending champions, but lost to Jorge Aguilar and Paul Capdeville in the first round.
Juan Sebastián Cabal and Robert Farah won the final against Franco Ferreiro and André Sá 7–5, 7–6(7–3).

Seeds

Draw

Draw

References
 Doubles Draw

Challenger Ciudad de Guayaquil - Doubles
2010 Doubles